Manfred McGeer (November 29, 1893 – January 22, 1955) was a Canadian politician. He served in the Legislative Assembly of British Columbia from 1940 to 1941  from the electoral district of Mackenzie, a member of the Liberal party.

References

1893 births
1955 deaths